Kinghorn railway station is a railway station in the town of Kinghorn, Fife, Scotland.

History 

The 1856 Ordnance survey shows just a station here. By 1895 the station had expanded, there were two platforms either side of a double track connected by a footbridge, a goods yard to the north west able to accommodate most types of goods including live stock and was equipped with a ¾ ton crane.

Two camping coaches were positioned here by the Scottish Region in 1964. 

The railway viaduct (solid other than four tall arches) splits the old town of Kinghorn in half.

Services 
One of the latter then returns to Edinburgh via  whilst the other terminates  at Glenrothes and returns via the coast.

Sundays see an hourly service each way via the Fire Circle.

References

External links 

Railway stations in Fife
Former North British Railway stations
Railway stations in Great Britain opened in 1847
Railway stations served by ScotRail
1847 establishments in Scotland
Kinghorn